Dirina approximata is a species of corticolous (bark-dwelling), crustose lichen in the family Roccellaceae. It was formally described by Alexander Zahlbruckner in 1931. It is endemic to the Galápagos Islands, where it grows on the bark of various trees and shrubs. Its sister species is Dirina sorocarpa, which is endemic to the Cape Verde Islands; Anders Tehler suggests that the large disjunct distribution between the two is the result of "ancient long distance dispersal event".

References

approximata
Lichen species
Lichens described in 1931
Taxa named by Alexander Zahlbruckner
Lichens of the Galápagos Islands